Blandine Boulekone is an advocate for women's rights in Vanuatu. She is the former president of the Vanuatu National Council of Women; she held the position from 2012 to 2014. She was also one of the founders of the Vanuatu Family Health Association, an organisation which works in health education, family planning and sex education. Boulekone has held the position of executive director of the anti-corruption NGO group Transparency International in Vanuatu.

References

Vanuatuan women in politics
Women nonprofit executives
Living people
Year of birth missing (living people)